PT Bank Central Asia Tbk, commonly known as Bank Central Asia (BCA) is an Indonesian bank founded on 21 February 1957. It is considered as the largest privately owned bank in Indonesia.

The Asian financial crisis in 1997 had a tremendous impact on Indonesia's entire banking system. In particular, it affected BCA's cash flow and even threatened its survival. A bank rush forced BCA to seek assistance and subsequent nationalization from the Indonesian government. The Indonesian Bank Restructuring Agency took over control of the bank in 1998. Full recovery was accomplished later in the same year. In December 1998, third-party funds were back at the pre-crisis level. BCA's assets stood at Rp 67.93 trillion, as opposed to Rp 53.36 trillion in December 1997. Public confidence in BCA was fully restored, and BCA was released by IBRA to BI in 2001.

Subsequently, BCA took a major step by going public. The IPO took place in 2000, selling 22.55% of BCA's shares that were being divested by IBRA. After the IPO, the agency still controlled 70.3% of BCA's total shares. The second public offering took place in June and July 2001, with IBRA divesting an additional 10% of its interest in BCA. In 2002, IBRA divested 51% of its BCA shares through a strategic private placement tender. The Mauritius-based Farindo Investment won the tender. In 2016 Farindo Investment transfered the shares to the Indonesian based Dwimuria Investama Andalan (also known Djarum Group) to take benefit from the 2016–17 Indonesian tax amnesty program.
There is a BCA representative office in Singapore.

History 
Bank Central Asia's beginnings began in 1955, founded as “NV Perseroan Dagang Dan Industrie Semarang Knitting Factory" by businessman Sudono Salim (Lim Sioe Liong). BCA commenced operations on 21 February 1957 with Head Office located in Jakarta.

Effective on 2 September 1975 the name of the Bank was changed to PT Bank Central Asia (BCA). BCA strengthens its delivery channels and obtained a license to open as a Foreign Exchange Bank in 1977.

Around 1980, BCA aggressively expanded its branch network in line with deregulation of the Indonesian banking sector. BCA developed its information technology capacity, by establishing an online system for its branch office network, and launches new products and services including the Tahapan BCA savings accounts product.
 
In 1990, BCA developed the Automated Teller Machine (ATM) network as an alternative delivery channel. In 1991, BCA installed 50 ATM units in various locations in Jakarta. BCA intensively develops the ATM network and features. BCA works with well-known institutions, such as PT Telkom and Citibank, allowing BCA's customers to pay their Telkom phone bill or Citibank credit card bill through BCA ATMs.

BCA experienced a panic selling during the 1997 Asian financial crisis. In 1998 BCA became a Bank Take Over (BTO) and was placed under the recapitalization and restructuring program operated by the Indonesian Bank Restructuring Agency (IBRA), a Government Institution.

In 1999, BCA was fully recapitalized with the Government of Indonesia, through IBRA, assuming ownership of 92.8% of BCA shares in exchange for liquidity support from Bank Indonesia and a swap of related-party loans for Government Bonds

In 2000, IBRA divested 22.5% of its BCA shares through an initial public offering, reducing its ownership of BCA to 70.3%. In 2001, in a Secondary Public Offering, 10% of BCA's total shares were made available to the market. IBRA's ownership of BCA decreased to 60.3%. In 2002, Farindo Investment (Mauritius) Limited acquired 51% of BCA's shares through a strategic private placement. In 2004, IBRA divested 1,4% of BCA shares to domestic investors through a private placement. In 2005, the Government of Indonesia through PT Perusahaan Pengelolaan Aset (PPA), the remaining 5.02% of its BCA shares and no longer has share ownership in BCA.

BCA strengthens and develops its products and services, especially in electronic banking, by launching Debit BCA, Tunai BCA, KlikBCA internet banking, m-BCA mobile banking, and EDCBIZZ.

In 2007, BCA became a pioneer in introducing fixed-rate mortgage products. BCA launches its stored-value card, Flazz Card, and introduced Weekend Banking to maintain its transaction banking leadership.

In 2010–2013, BCA entered new lines of business including Sharia banking, motorcycle financing, general insurance and the capital markets business. In 2013, BCA increased its effective ownership from 25% to 100% in its general insurance arm PT Asuransi Umum BCA (formerly PT Central Sejahtera Insurance and also known as BCA Insurance).

In 2014–2016, BCA developed MyBCA, a self-service digital banking outlet; expanded cash recycling machine-based ATM networks; and launched the Sakuku app-based electronic wallet. BCA continued developing various methods of payment for online transactions. In 2018 BCA launched a peer-to-peer transfer feature using QR code technology, applicable on m-BCA and Sakuku.

BCA completed a 100% share acquisition (directly and indirectly) of PT Bank Royal Indonesia in October 2019. Post-acquisition, Bank Royal's business model will transform into a digital-based bank, complementing BCA's established digital channels.

Board of Commissioners and Directors

* independent commissioner

References

External links

KlikBCA Official site 
CNN coverage on sale of BCA to Farindo Investments
BCA Logo Vector 
Detail kartu kredit BCA 

Banks established in 1957
Banks of Indonesia
Companies based in Jakarta
Companies listed on the Indonesia Stock Exchange
Indonesian brands
Indonesian companies established in 1957
2000 initial public offerings